Jacob Holt may refer to:
Jacob W. Holt (1811-1880), American carpenter and builder
Jacob Holdt (born 1947), Danish photographer